Jeffrey Jost (sometimes listed as Jeff Jost) is an American bobsledder who competed from the late 1970s to the mid-1980s. He won the Bobsleigh World Cup four-man event in 1984–85, although at the time, that classification was unofficial.

Competing in two Winter Olympics, Jost earned his best finish of fifth in the four-man event at Sarajevo in 1984.

References
1980 bobsleigh four-man results
1984 bobsleigh four-man results
List of four-man bobsleigh World Cup champions since 1985

American male bobsledders
Bobsledders at the 1980 Winter Olympics
Bobsledders at the 1984 Winter Olympics
Olympic bobsledders of the United States
Living people
Year of birth missing (living people)